Deborah Willis is a Canadian short story writer.

Biography 

Daughter of Pauline and Gary Willis, she was born in Calgary, Alberta in 1982 and lived there until leaving to study at the University of Victoria.

Writing 

Willis' fiction has appeared in The Virginia Quarterly, The Iowa Review, PRISM international, The Walrus, and Zoetrope. Her first book, Vanishing and Other Stories (2009), published by Penguin, was named one of The Globe and Mail'''s Best Books of 2009, and was nominated for the BC Book Prize, the Danuta Gleed Literary Award, the Victoria Butler Book Prize and the Governor General's Award. It was published in the United States by Harper Perennial in 2010 and translated into Hebrew (Kinneret Zmora-Bitan Dvir Publishing) and Italian (Svanire , Del Vecchio Editore). 

Her second collection of short fiction, The Dark and Other Love Stories (2017), was published by Hamish Hamilton, the literary imprint of Penguin Canada, and by W.W. Norton and Company in the U.S. It will be translated into Italian and published by Del Vecchio Editore. The Dark and Other Love Stories was longlisted for the 2017 Scotiabank Giller Prize.

Deborah Willis has been a horseback riding instructor, a reporter, a technical writer, and worked as a bookseller at Munroe's Books in Victoria, British Columbia.Willis, Deborah, Vanishing and other stories, Toronto, Penguin, 2009, p. i. She was a writer-in-residence at the Joy Kogawa House in Vancouver, was Canadian Writer-in-Residence in the Calgary Distinguished Writers Program at the University of Calgary for the 2012-2013 academic year, and is currently the Writer in Residence at MacEwan University in Edmonton. 

In an interview Willis mentioned that her favourite book is The Great Gatsby and her favourite book as a child was Anne of Green Gables. Her current least favourite word is shard. Willis advises writers to keep going and have faith in the process. She believes the writer's block which she thinks often results from obsession with one's self, but also maintains that the writer's block is curable. 

Commenting on Willis's work, Alice Munro has said "The emotional range and depth of these stories, the clarity and the deftness, is astonishing." 

References

External links
Deborah Willis Home Page Retrieved 2011-11-27.
Kathryn Carter, "Short Simplicities"(review of Vanishing and other stories), Canadian Literature'', No. 27 (Winter 2010), p. 169-70. Retrieved 2011-11-27.
Eric Volmers,"Heaps of praise help Calgary writer Deborah Willis accept her role as short story master" Retrieved 2012-11-21
Presentation of Svanire (in Italian) Retrieved 2013-04-05.
Svanire, Del Vecchio Editore Retrieved 2013-09-05.

Canadian women short story writers
21st-century Canadian women writers
Writers from Calgary
University of Victoria alumni
Jewish Canadian writers
21st-century Canadian short story writers
1982 births
Living people